West End Historic District, also known as the West Central Neighborhood, is a national historic district located at Fort Wayne, Indiana.  The district encompasses 596 contributing buildings in a predominantly residential section of Fort Wayne. The area was developed from about 1840 to 1935, and includes notable examples of Greek Revival, Late Victorian, and Bungalow / American Craftsman style residential architecture.  It is the location of numerous middle- and upper-income residential buildings, the University of Saint Francis Performing Arts Center (formerly the Scottish Rite Auditorium), and Trinity English Lutheran Church—the last designed by Bertram Grosvenor Goodhue.

Several buildings within the District are individually listed on the National Register of Historic Places, including the Christian G. Strunz House, John Claus Peters House, and Trinity Episcopal Church.

It was listed on the National Register of Historic Places in 1984.

References

Houses on the National Register of Historic Places in Indiana
Historic districts on the National Register of Historic Places in Indiana
Greek Revival architecture in Indiana
Victorian architecture in Indiana
National Register of Historic Places in Fort Wayne, Indiana
Houses in Fort Wayne, Indiana